Alvin Kirkland is an American former American football and rugby league player.
Kirkland was a member of the "American All Stars" rugby league team a team made up of American college football players that went on the 1953 American All Stars tour of Australia and New Zealand. None of them had played rugby league before the tour. Kirkland returned to Australia in 1956, and played all regular season  matches for the Parramatta District Rugby League Football Club in that year's New South Wales Rugby Football League season.

References

External links
 Al Kirkland's statistics from AFL Tables website

Year of birth missing (living people)
Living people
American rugby league players
Leeds Rhinos players
Parramatta Eels players
United States national rugby league team players